See Austin A40 for other A40 models.

The Austin A40 Somerset is a motor car which was produced by the Austin Motor Company from 1952 until 1954. The Somerset replaced the Austin A40 Devon and, as a body-on-frame car, it was comparable in size to its predecessor. It shared a number of components with the Devon which included a similar 1.2 litre straight-4 pushrod engine.

Engineering

The Somerset features an updated "Transatlantic" body style with flowing lines as distinct from the Devon's bulky looking body. Resembling the larger Austin A70 Hereford, its design was aimed at improving export sales, particularly to America. Initially offered as only a 4-door saloon, a 3-passenger 2-door convertible, of the same body style was introduced in late 1952. The convertible replaced the earlier Austin A40 Dorset. 

The body of the convertible was made by Carbodies of Coventry and the model was marketed as the Austin A40 Somerset Coupé. This particular style was also known as a 'drophead' coupé in the United Kingdom. The convertible differed from the saloon in having separate front seats that folded forward to give access to the rear. An additional convertible, the Austin A40 Sports, was carried over from the earlier A40 Devon and Dorset range but was discontinued with the arrival of the Somerset Coupé.

In 1953 the Austin Motor Company produced a "special" version of around 500 Somerset saloons using the  more powerful engine from the 'sports' model which incorporated twin SU carburettors in place of the single Zenith downdraught type. This vehicle featured different interior appointments and two-tone paintwork to set it aside from the standard offering.

The standard Somerset interior contained two close fitting front seats, finished in leather, which could be arranged as a bench seat and a large deeply cushioned rear bench seat which could accommodate three passengers. With a centrally mounted dashboard or instrument panel, Austin incorporated a four speed, plus reverse, gearbox into the car's design which was controlled by a column mounted gear change lever. Four-wheel, foot-operated hydraulic brakes, and a handbrake operating on the rear wheels only, provided the car's stopping power.

Performance

These figures were all obtained on the contemporary low octane fuel. The test car cost £705 including taxes.

The Austin A40 Somerset saloon's reputation for being somewhat slow and lumbering to drive is not wholly deserved. It had to endure poor-quality petrol supplies in 1952, and in consequence had retarded ignition settings to tolerate the low octane rating of the fuels available to avoid the engine knocking or 'pinking' condition that was well known in those times. In fact, British Motor Corporation later produced a kit to improve the performance and fuel consumption of these cars once premium fuel supplies resumed under the popular petrol brands. This kit comprised a replacement distributor and an optional cylinder head gasket that was thinner and therefore raised the compression slightly from the standard 7.2:1.

The standing quarter mile was down from 24.4 secs to 23.2 secs, a marked improvement on the former result taken in 1952 and directly comparable with the Mini 850 launched in 1959, that was considered to be fairly brisk then.

Production

Over 173,000 Somersets were sold before it was replaced by the A40 Cambridge in 1954. 7,243 were convertibles.

In December 1952 an agreement was signed with the Japanese automobile company Datsun to build Austin vehicles under licence using Complete Knock Down Kits (CKD) supplied from the UK. In April 1953 the first Japanese assembled Somersets rolled off the assembly line ready for sale on the local market to which it was restricted. Assembly ceased in November 1954 when the factory switched to the A50 Cambridge.

References

External links
Austin Counties Car Club—Owners club website

A40 Somerset
Cars introduced in 1952
Sedans
Convertibles
Rear-wheel-drive vehicles

sv:Austin A40